Michael Brian Dugan (born August 19, 1963) is an American politician who is currently serving in the Georgia State Senate representing the 30th District. He was the Republican Majority leader from 2019 to 2023.

References

External links 
 Senator Dugan's biography at the Official Website of the General Assembly of Georgia
 Senator Dugan on Twitter

1963 births
21st-century American politicians
Living people
People from Carrollton, Georgia
Republican Party Georgia (U.S. state) state senators